George Courtney McCarty (October 15, 1915 – November 30, 2011) was an American college basketball coach and athletic director.

McCarty attended and played football at New Mexico State University.  His college career was interrupted by World War II as he was drafted into the U. S. Army.  McCarty served until 1946 and reached the rank of lieutenant colonel as a pilot and flight instructor.

McCarty's college coaching career began at his alma mater, as he led the Aggies to a 65–55 record from 1949 to 1953. He then moved to UTEP, where he coached from 1953 to 1959.  He compiled a record of 75–58 and broke the color barrier at UTEP, recruiting the program's first African-American player, Charles Brown.

Following his stint as head coach of the Miners, McCarty was named athletic director at UTEP, a position he held until 1970.  During this time, he hired future Hall of Fame coach Don Haskins - who brought UTEP their only national basketball championship in 1966.  In 1970, McCarty left UTEP to become athletic director at the University of Wyoming, where he served until 1980.  He retired to Albuquerque, where he ran the fund-raising efforts of the school's athletic club.

McCarty died November 30, 2011 at his home in Marble Falls, Texas.

Head coaching record

References

1915 births
2011 deaths
American men's basketball coaches
Basketball coaches from Texas
College men's basketball head coaches in the United States
New Mexico State Aggies football players
New Mexico State Aggies men's basketball coaches
People from Bowie County, Texas
People from Marble Falls, Texas
United States Army officers
UTEP Miners athletic directors
UTEP Miners men's basketball coaches
Wyoming Cowboys and Cowgirls athletic directors
Military personnel from Texas